Picture Me Broken is an American rock band originating from Redwood City, California, but is now located in Southern California. They have released two EPs and one album. They were named in 2009 as one of the top unsigned bands by PureVolume, and won an MTV Video Music Award in 2009 for Best Breakout Bay Area Artist. Their song "Dearest, I'm So Sorry" was available as downloadable content for Rock Band 2. The band has been on hiatus from touring since 2014.

History
Picture Me Broken was formed in 2005 by Layla Brooklyn Allman, lead singer and keyboardist, and bassist, Austin Dunn. The band was originally called 'Lane Four' with 'Lane' reflecting the first initial of the original four band members (Layla, Austin, Nick, and Eric).  After several member changes and evolving style, the band settled into its new name:  Picture Me Broken.  With early performances consisting of covers made famous by some of rock's best known icons, the band now writes, performs and records its own songs and has had several releases.

In December 2012, the band released a 4-song EP (Mannequins), produced by multi-platinum award-winning producer, David Bendeth and has received acclaimed reviews from various rock publications, including Rockstar Glued, Examiner.com and MetalliVille.

Picture Me Broken was the sole opening act for the Alice Cooper / Marilyn Manson Masters of Madness – Shock Therapy nationwide tour which began in June 2013 and ended on July 21, 2013.

Brooklyn Allman/Picture Me Broken have played some venues with Orianthi and her band.

Discography

Music videos
 "Live Forever" (2009)
 "Dearest (I'm So Sorry)" (2010)
 "Torture" (2013)
 "Mannequins" (2013)
 "Skin and Bones" (2015)

Albums
 Wide Awake (2010)

EP
 Dearest, I'm So Sorry (2009)
 Mannequins (2012)

Singles
 "Crazy on You" (2011)
 "Dependency" (2012)

Band members
Current members
 Layla Brooklyn Allman – vocals, keyboards (2005–present)
 Dante Phoenix – guitars (2010–present)
Former members
 Eric Perkins – drums (2005–2009)
 Nick Loiacono – lead guitar (2005–2010)
 Austin Dunn – bass (2005–2013)
 Will Escher – rhythm guitar (2006–2010)
 Connor Lung – drums (2009–2012)
 Shaun Foist – drums (2012–2013)
 Jimmy Strimpel – guitars (2011–2014)

Guest performances
 Tyler Bush – vocals

References

External links
 Picture Me Broken on Facebook
 Picture Me Broken on MySpace
 Bio on SonicBids.com
 Review of the Dearest (I'm So Sorry) EP on The Trades

Emo musical groups from California
American post-hardcore musical groups
Hard rock musical groups from California
Musical groups established in 2005
Musical groups from the San Francisco Bay Area